The Trim-Slice is a small, fanless nettop computer manufactured by the Israeli company CompuLab. Trim-Slice is the first commercially available desktop computer based on the NVIDIA Tegra 2. It was announced in January 2011 and began shipping in late April 2011.

In July 2013 CompuLab announced its successor, the Utilite computer, a single to quad core computer based on the Freescale i.MX6 SoC  which has since then become one of the most popular fanless computers worldwide.

See also
 Industrial PC

References

External links
 

Computer-related introductions in 2011
Linux-based devices
Computers and the environment
Nettop